Illinois Center is a mixed-use urban development in downtown Chicago, Illinois, USA, lying east of Michigan Avenue. It is notable in that the streets running through it have three levels. Elsewhere in Chicago, some streets have two levels, with the lower level for through traffic and service vehicles and the upper level for other local traffic. In Illinois Center, the lower level has been split, with a middle level for through traffic and a lower level for service vehicles.

The development was built on land that had formerly been used for railroad yards by the Illinois Central Railroad, which merged into the Canadian National Railway in 1999. The earliest building is One Illinois Center designed by Ludwig Mies van der Rohe and completed in 1970. The west half of the rail yards were built out first; the east half was for a time turned into a temporary golf course on the lowest level, where the rail yards had been. The golf course has since been turned into a park, now surrounded by an urban village of high-rise buildings called Lakeshore East.

The development consists of four blocks with a large area to the east. It is bounded on the west by Michigan Avenue, which has two levels. Just east of that road, the upper level rises to become a higher third level, only accessible on the west edge of the development and at the east end of Upper Wacker Drive. Stetson Avenue and Columbus Drive run north-south, and Lake Street, South Water Street, and Wacker Drive run east-west. Randolph Street lies a block south of the main part, and forms the south border of the east half.

All of these streets are at least partly triple-decker. In the south half of the complex, the Metra Electric Lines and the South Shore Line terminate, halfway between Michigan and Stetson Avenues, at Millennium Station. An additional structure, Boulevard Towers East an 80-story mixed-use building was planned on the west side of Stetson between South Water and Lake Street but was cancelled. The site of this proposed building is the last remaining vacant lot in the Illinois Center complex, referred to by locals as the "Political Graveyard". Also proposed for this site was Mandarin Oriental Chicago.

On February 18, 2009, a report in Crain's Chicago Business stated that a New York-based lender had filed a foreclosure suit against the developer, that the sale's center was closed and building units were no longer being marketed through the Multiple Listing Service. The project is no longer listed on the developer's website.

One Prudential Plaza, Two Prudential Plaza and the Aon Center are in the blocks south of the main part.

See also
Chicago Pedway

References

External links 

Skyscrapers in Chicago
Central Chicago